Cynthia Gabisile Tshabalala, also spelled Gabsile Tshabalala, is a South African politician who has represented the African National Congress (ANC) in the Mpumalanga Provincial Legislature since 2014. She was formerly Mpumalanga's Member of the Executive Council (MEC) for Community Safety, Security and Liaison from May 2019 to February 2021.

Legislative career 
Tshabalala was active in the ANC Youth League in Mpumalanga. She was elected to the provincial legislature in the 2014 general election, ranked 20th on the ANC's provincial party list. She served as the legislature's Deputy Chief Whip during the legislative term that followed. She was re-elected to her legislative seat in the 2019 general election, ranked 14th on the ANC's party list. 

Shortly after the 2019 election, she was appointed to the Mpumalanga Executive Council by Refilwe Mtsweni-Tsipane, the incumbent Premier of Mpumalanga, who named her MEC for Community Safety, Security and Liaison. Tshabalala served less than two years as MEC before Mtsweni-Tsipane fired her on 24 February 2021. She was fired along with three other MECs who, like Tshabalala, were viewed as loyalists of Deputy President David Mabuza, Mtsweni-Tsipane's predecessor and political rival.

References

External links 
 

Living people
Year of birth missing (living people)
Members of the Mpumalanga Provincial Legislature
African National Congress politicians
21st-century South African politicians